Bartholomew was bishop of Veszprém in Hungary from 1226 to 1244. He had been a cleric in the service of Yolanda of Courtenay (d. 1233), second wife of King Andrew II of Hungary. In 1232, he sued Ban Oguz for lands before the community of the nobles of Zala County.

References

Sources 

 
 

Bishops of Veszprém
13th-century Roman Catholic bishops in Hungary